Admiral Sir William Donough O'Brien,  (13 November 1916 – 19 February 2016) was a senior officer in the Royal Navy who served as Commander-in-Chief of the Western Fleet from 1970 to 1971.

Naval career
Educated at the Royal Naval College Dartmouth, O'Brien was commissioned into the Royal Navy in 1930. He served in the Second World War, during which he served with the naval escort of the fateful PQ 17 convoy.

In the early 1960s, O'Brien served as Director of Naval Plans at the Ministry of Defence under Lord Louis Mountbatten. He was then appointed Naval Secretary in 1964. He was appointed Flag Officer, Aircraft Carriers in 1966, Commander-in-Chief, Far East Fleet in 1967, and Commander-in-Chief of the Western Fleet in 1970. He retired in 1971.

Later life
In retirement, O'Brien became Chairman of the King George's Fund for Sailors. In 1975 he was Chairman of the Royal Navy Club of 1765 & 1785 (United 1889). He became Chairman of the Kennet and Avon Canal and, after its re-opening by Queen Elizabeth II in 1990, he retired from this post. He also held the posts of Rear-Admiral and then Vice-Admiral of the United Kingdom. He died after a brief illness on 19 February 2016, aged 99.

Family
In 1943, O'Brien married Rita Micallef: they went on to have one son and two daughters.

References

External links
 Imperial War Museum Interview

|-

|-

|-

|-

1916 births
2016 deaths
Knights Commander of the Order of the Bath
Recipients of the Distinguished Service Cross (United Kingdom)
Royal Navy admirals
Royal Navy officers of World War II
Military personnel from Kent